(24 October 1931 – 14 March 2014) was a Japanese actor who worked on stage, film, and television from the 1950s to the 2010s.

Career and death
Born in Tokyo, Utsui entered the Haiyūza theatre troupe in 1952 and was soon selected to star in the film Seishun no izumi that was produced by Haiyūza. In 1954, he signed a contract with Shintoho and starred in 60 films, including the Super Giant series. He moved to Daiei Film in 1963 and starred in another 52 films. From the mid-1960s, he also began to work on television, starring in many television dramas, especially detective series like The Guardman and Sasurai keiji junjōhen and some installments of the Akai series with Momoe Yamaguchi. He died on 14 March 2014 from natural causes at the age of 82.

Selected filmography

Film
 Ningen gyorai kaiten (人間魚雷回天 Ningen gyorai kaiten) (1955)
 Revenge of the Pearl Queen (1956)
 Senun Ajia no joo (戦雲アジアの女王) (1957)
 Evil Brain from Outer Space (1964)
 Attack from Space (1964)
 Invaders from Space (1964)
 Atomic Rulers of the World (1964)
Giant Horde Beast Nezura (1964)
 The Bullet Train (1975)
 Saimin (催眠) (1999)
 Blooming Again (2004)
 Gokusen - The Movie (2009) (Ryuichiro Kuroda)

Television
Akai Meiro (1974) – adoptive father
 Akai Unmei (1976) – father of Izumi
 Akai Shisen (1980) – carjack victim and pilot
 Takeda Shingen (1988) – Naoe Kagetsuna
 Onna tachi no Hyakuman goku (1988) – Maeda Toshiie
 Nobunaga (1991) – Hayashi Michikatsu
 Aoi (2000) – Mōri Terumoto
 Gokusen (2002–2005) – Ryuichiro Kuroda
 Wataru Seken wa Oni Bakari (2006-13) - Daikichi Okakura
 Tenchijin (2009) – Maeda Toshiie

References

External links

Official profile (in Japanese)

Japanese male actors
1931 births
2014 deaths
People from Tokyo